BSR Valladolid, more commonly known by its sponsorship naming Fundación Grupo Norte, is a wheelchair basketball team based in Valladolid, Castile and Léon, Spain.

History
BSR Valladolid was founded in 1994 as Club Deportivo Aspaym Castilla y León. In 1998 the team made its debut in the División de Honor, the Spanish top league, where it competes until now. Since 2002, the club is sponsored by Fundación Grupo Norte.

In 2010 Valladolid won the Willi Brinkmann Cup, the third tier in European wheelchair basketball, and in 2011 it won the Spanish League for the first time in its history.

Season by season

Notable players
 Antonio Henares
 Diego de Paz
 Alejandro Zarzuela
 Tristan Knowles
 Dan Highcock
 Salvador Zavala

References

External links
 Official website

Basketball teams in Castile and León
Wheelchair basketball teams in Spain
Sport in Valladolid